Friendswood Development Company is a real estate development company operating in Greater Houston. The company is a subsidiary of Lennar.

The company is best known for developing Kingwood, a 15,000-acre master-planned community northeast of Houston with more than 20,000 homes, developed over a 40-year period.

History timeline

 The company was founded in 1962 as a subsidiary of Humble Oil.
 In 1963, the company established Clear Lake City, its first project.
 In 1991, the company broke ground on the first new office building in Houston in 5 years.
 In June 1995, Exxon put the company up for sale.
 In December 1995, Lennar acquired the company for $110 million.
 In 2014, the company expanded several of its communities.
 In 2015, the company announced 3 new communities in northeast Houston.
 In 2016, the company opened Knoll Park, its first development in urban Houston.
 In 2017, the company launched its third residential development in Houston.

References

Companies based in Houston
Real estate companies established in 1962
American companies established in 1962
Real estate companies of the United States
Former ExxonMobil subsidiaries
1962 establishments in Texas